Tse Kwan-ho (born 23 March 1963) is a Hong Kong actor, professionally also known as Gardner Tse. Originally a nurse, Tse Kwan-ho rose to prominence in the stage play The Mad Phoenix, this was later remade into a feature film of the same name, and for which Tse would win the 1997 Golden Horse Best Actor award. Following The Mad Phoenix Tse went on to become a full-time actor and has since appeared in stage, television, film and radio serial productions.

Career
Tse graduated from Hong Kong Academy for Performing Arts in 1989, he joined the Hong Kong Repertory Theatre and was with them for the next eight years. In 1997 he joined Raymond To and Clifton To's Springtime Stage Productions Limited and appeared in "Pygmalion" and "Magic is the Moonlight". He is a prolific film, television and stage actor.

Filmography

Film

Television series

Theater

The Mad Phoenix
I Have a Date with Spring

Awards and nominations

References

External links
,

1963 births
Living people
Hong Kong male film actors
Hong Kong male television actors
Hong Kong male voice actors
21st-century Hong Kong male actors
Hong Kong male stage actors